In mathematics, the residue field is a basic construction in commutative algebra. If R is a commutative ring and m is a maximal ideal, then the residue field is the quotient ring k = R/m, which is a field. Frequently, R is a local ring and m is then its unique maximal ideal.

This construction is applied in algebraic geometry, where to every point x of a scheme X one associates its residue field k(x).  One can say a little loosely that the residue field of a point of an abstract algebraic variety is the 'natural domain' for the coordinates of the point.

Definition
Suppose that R is a commutative local ring, with maximal ideal m. Then the residue field is the quotient ring R/m.

Now suppose that X is a scheme and x is a point of X. By the definition of scheme, we may find an affine neighbourhood U = Spec(A), with A some commutative ring. Considered in the neighbourhood U, the point x corresponds to a prime ideal p ⊆ A (see Zariski topology). The local ring of X in x is by definition the localization R = Ap, with the maximal ideal m = p·Ap. Applying the construction above, we obtain the residue field of the point x :

k(x) := Ap / p·Ap.

One can prove that this definition does not depend on the choice of the affine neighbourhood U.

A point is called K-rational for a certain field K, if k(x) = K.

Example
Consider the affine line A1(k) = Spec(k[t]) over a field k. If k is algebraically closed, there are exactly two types of prime ideals, namely

(t − a), a ∈ k 
(0), the zero-ideal.

The residue fields are

, the function field over k in one variable.

If k is not algebraically closed, then more types arise, for example if k = R, then the prime ideal (x2 + 1) has residue field isomorphic to C.

Properties
 For a scheme locally of finite type over a field k, a point x is closed if and only if k(x) is a finite extension of the base field k.  This is a geometric formulation of Hilbert's Nullstellensatz. In the above example, the points of the first kind are closed, having residue field k, whereas the second point is the generic point, having transcendence degree 1 over k. 
 A morphism Spec(K) → X, K some field, is equivalent to giving a point x ∈ X and an extension K/k(x).
 The dimension of a scheme of finite type over a field is equal to the transcendence degree of the residue field of the generic point.

References

Further reading
 , section II.2